Karl-Heinz Merschenz (born 1 November 1936) is a Canadian racewalker. He competed at the 1968 Summer Olympics and the 1972 Summer Olympics.

References

1936 births
Living people
Athletes (track and field) at the 1967 Pan American Games
Athletes (track and field) at the 1968 Summer Olympics
Athletes (track and field) at the 1970 British Commonwealth Games
Athletes (track and field) at the 1972 Summer Olympics
Canadian male racewalkers
Olympic track and field athletes of Canada
German emigrants to Canada
Athletes from Berlin
Commonwealth Games competitors for Canada
Pan American Games track and field athletes for Canada